Calcium cyanamide, also known as Calcium carbondiamide is the inorganic compound with the formula CaCN2. It is the calcium salt of the cyanamide anion. This chemical is used as fertilizer and is commercially known as nitrolime. It was first synthesized in 1898 by Adolph Frank and Nikodem Caro (Frank–Caro process).

History 
In their search for a new process for producing cyanides for cyanide leaching of gold, Frank and Caro discovered the ability of alkaline earth carbides to absorb atmospheric nitrogen at high temperatures. Fritz Rothe, a colleague of Frank and Caro, succeeded in 1898 in overcoming problems with the use of calcium carbide and clarified that at around 1,100 °C not calcium cyanide but calcium cyanamide is formed in the reaction. In fact, the initial target product sodium cyanide can also be obtained from calcium cyanamide by melting it with sodium chloride in the presence of carbon:
 CaCN2 + 2 NaCl + C → 2 NaCN + CaCl2

Frank and Caro developed this reaction for a large-scale, continuous production process. The process was particularly challenging due to the equipment requirements required by the high temperatures during the initial igniter step. This process requires meticulous temperature control since the melting point of calcium cyanamide is only about 120°C lower than the boiling point of sodium chloride.

In 1901, Ferdinand Eduard Polzeniusz patented a process that converts calcium carbide to calcium cyanamide in the presence of 10% calcium chloride at 700 °C. The advantage of lowering the reaction temperature by about 400 °C, however, must be weighed against the high amount of calcium chloride required and the discontinuous process control. Nevertheless, both processes (the Rothe–Frank–Caro process and the Polzeniusz-Krauss process) played a role in the first half of the 20th century. In the record year 1945, a total of approx. 1.5 million tonnes were produced worldwide using both processes. Frank and Caro also noted the formation of ammonia from calcium cyanamide.

CaCN2 + 3 H2O → 2 NH3 + CaCO3

Albert Frank recognized the fundamental importance of this reaction as a breakthrough in the provision of ammonia from atmospheric nitrogen and in 1901 recommended calcium cyanamide as a nitrogen fertilizer. Between 1908 and 1919, five calcium cyanamide plants with a total capacity of 500,000 tonnes per year were set up in Germany, and one in Switzerland. It was at the time the cheapest nitrogen fertilizer with additional efficacy against weeds and plant pests and had great advantages over conventional nitrogen fertilizers. However, the large-scale implementation of ammonia synthesis via the Haber process became a serious competitor to the very energy-intensive Frank Caro process. As urea (formed via the Haber–Bosch process) was significantly more nitrogen-rich (46% compared to ca. 20% nitrogen content) cheaper and faster acting, the role of calcium cyanamide was gradually reduced to a multifunctional nitrogen fertilizer in niche applications. Other reasons for its loss of popularity were its dirty-black color, dusty appearance and irritating properties, as well as its inhibition of an alcohol-degrading enzyme which causes temporary accumulation of acetaldehyde in the body leading to dizziness, nausea, and alcohol flush reaction when alcohol is consumed around the time of bodily exposure.

Production
Calcium cyanamide is prepared from calcium carbide. The carbide powder is heated at about 1000 °C in an electric furnace into which nitrogen is passed for several hours. The product is cooled to ambient temperatures and any unreacted carbide is leached out cautiously with water.
CaC2 + N2 → CaCN2 + C (ΔH = –69.0 kcal/mol at 25 °C)

It crystallizes in hexagonal crystal system with space group R3m and lattice constants a = 3.67 Å, c = 14.85 Å.

Uses

The main use of calcium cyanamide is in agriculture as a fertilizer. In contact with water, it decomposes and liberates ammonia:
 CaCN2 + 3 H2O → 2 NH3 + CaCO3

It was used to produce sodium cyanide by fusing with sodium carbonate:
 CaCN2 + Na2CO3 + 2 C → 2 NaCN + CaO + 2 CO

Sodium cyanide is used in cyanide process in gold mining. It can also be used in the preparation of calcium cyanide and melamine.

Through hydrolysis in the presence of carbon dioxide, calcium cyanamide produces cyanamide:
CaCN2 + H2O + CO2 → CaCO3 + H2NCN

The conversion is conducted in slurries. For this reason, most commercial calcium cyanamide is sold as an aqueous solution.

Thiourea can be produced by the reaction of hydrogen sulfide with calcium cyanamide in the presence of carbon dioxide.

Calcium cyanamide is also used as a wire-fed alloy in steelmaking to introduce nitrogen into the steel.

Safety
The substance can cause alcohol intolerance, before or after the consumption of alcohol.

References

External links

Bioassay of Calcium Cyanamide for Possible Carcinogenicity (CAS No. 156-62-7)

Calcium compounds
Cyanamides
Inorganic fertilizers